Frog Bikes is a UK bicycle manufacturer. They specialise in producing bikes for children aged 1 to 14, including balance bikes. They use the motto "the lightweight kids' bike". The family business was started by Jerry Lawson with his wife Shelley Lawson in 2013 with their head office in Ascot and their own factory based in the South Wales town of Pontypool.

They started manufacturing in the UK in 2016 moving production back from China to improve lead times and quality.

Frog Bikes have received support and funding from the Welsh Government and received the Queens Award for Enterprise. In 2018 they won Manufacturer of the Year at the 'Made in the UK' awards.

Reception 

The Frog 52 was listed by Wired Magazine as the best kids bike for 'all-round value' in a 2018 article that commented on their reputation for "quality do-it-all starter bikes".

Prince Louis rode one of the bikes to nursery on his first day in April 2021.

References 

Cycle manufacturers of the United Kingdom
Companies of Wales
Privately held companies of Wales
British companies established in 2013
Manufacturing companies established in 2013